Shadiyakh or Shadyakh (presumably, a contracted form of , Shadi-Kakh means (The) Palace of Happiness) was one of the  main palaces, gardens and great neighborhoods of Nishapur in the Middle Ages. It was established by Abdullah ibn Tahir al-Khurasani in  the 9th century AD, becoming more  important and populated after that. Some notable people like Attar of Nishapur lived there. Attar's tomb is now in that area. This palace was perhaps completely ruined in 13th century AD. Shadyakh Is now an archeological site open to tourists and it is part of the national heritage list of Iran, with the registration number of 10910.

Archaeology 
Excavations began in 2000 there and continued for around 2 years: buildings (possibly a palace), skeletons, equipment and other items were discovered by archeologists.

References 

Persian Wikipedia

Buildings and structures in Nishapur
Archaeological sites in Iran
Buildings and structures in Razavi Khorasan Province
Tourist attractions in Razavi Khorasan Province